Dudley Jack Barnato Joel (26 April 1904 – 28 May 1941) was a British businessman and Conservative Party politician.

Part of the wealthy and prominent Joel family, he was the son of businessman Solomon Barnato Joel and his wife Ellen (Nellie) Ridle; he was married to Esme Oldham.

Heavily involved in Thoroughbred horse racing, in 1922, his father purchased Moulton Paddocks in Newmarket from the estate of Sir Ernest Cassel. On his father's death in 1931, Dudley Joel inherited the property.

In the 1931 general election, Dudley Joel was elected as the member of parliament (MP) for Dudley. He was re-elected to Parliament in 1935. With the outbreak of the Second World War, he joined the Royal Naval Volunteer Reserve and was killed in action on 28 May 1941 when the steam merchant HMS Registan was bombed by German aircraft off Cape Cornwall.

Joel is buried in the family plot at the Willesden Jewish Cemetery in London.

References

External links 
 

Dudley
1904 births
1941 deaths
Military personnel from London
Royal Navy personnel killed in World War II
Burials at Willesden Jewish Cemetery
Conservative Party (UK) MPs for English constituencies
Jewish British politicians
Royal Naval Volunteer Reserve personnel of World War II
Royal Navy officers of World War II
UK MPs 1931–1935
UK MPs 1935–1945
20th-century English businesspeople
Deaths by airstrike during World War II